Erwin James Monahan (born 1957) is a columnist and convicted murderer who has written for The Guardian since 1998, writing under the name "Erwin James" whilst still incarcerated. He was released in August 2004 having served 20 years of a life sentence. From 2000 he wrote a regular column about prison life entitled A Life Inside, the first column of its kind in the history of British journalism. He continued to write for the national press and became the editor-in-chief of Inside Time, a national newspaper in the UK for people in prison, as well as doing charity work, since his release. While he was in prison he did not receive fees for his articles; instead these were paid to a charity, the Prisoners' Advice Service, which had helped him.

Background
Monahan's mother died in a car crash when he was seven, he was separated from his sister when she was twenty months old. Following the crash his grieving father turned to alcohol and became a violent drunk, inflicting much of his angst on his subsequent partners and on the young Erwin. Monahan committed his first crime when he was ten, breaking into a sweet shop. He eventually notched up 53 criminal convictions, including for burglary, theft, criminal damage, assault and mugging and including the final two for murder for which he was sentenced to life imprisonment.

Monahan and his co-defendant, William Ross, whom he had met in a squat in London, were convicted of murdering theatrical agent Greville Hallam and solicitor Angus Cochran in 1982. Hallam was found strangled in his home in London. Cochran was murdered three months later after being mugged. Following the murders Monahan fled to France and joined the French Foreign Legion, serving in Corsica and Africa. After receiving information from Ross, Monahan was traced by Scotland Yard, and in August 1984 he handed himself in to the British Consul in Nice.

Monahan and Ross both pleaded not guilty to murder on both charges, each blaming the other for the killings. Another man implicated in the murders, Paul Dunwell, avoided prosecution by agreeing to give evidence for the prosecution against the pair. Justice Otton, who presided over the case, described Monahan as "brutal, vicious and callous" and sentenced him to life imprisonment with a minimum term of 14 years, subsequently increased to 25 years by the Home Secretary.
Ross was also sentenced to life imprisonment; he was released from prison to a hostel in March 2014.

In January 2006, Monahan wrote an article for G2, a section of The Guardian (as "Erwin James"), recalling his time in the French Foreign Legion. In 2009 he admitted that part of the article contained information detailing experiences in Beirut which were untrue, as he had not, in fact, served there.

For the majority of the time during which he wrote for The Guardian the circumstances leading to his arrests and convictions were not revealed, but in April 2009 Monahan's full name became public.

Monahan wrote in G2 in April 2009 that his behaviour had been unforgivable and that "I seek no forgiveness now."

Published works
A Life Inside: A Prisoner's Notebook (2003)
The Home Stretch: From Prison to Parole  (2005)
Redeemable: A Memoir of Darkness and Hope (2016)

References

1957 births
Living people
English male journalists
English people convicted of murder
The Guardian journalists
20th-century pseudonymous writers
21st-century pseudonymous writers
Soldiers of the French Foreign Legion
People convicted of murder by England and Wales
Prisoners sentenced to life imprisonment by England and Wales
English prisoners sentenced to life imprisonment